Edith Emily Dornwell BSc (31 August 1865 – 18 November 1945) (later Raymond) was the first woman in Australia to graduate with a science degree, the first woman to graduate from the University of Adelaide, and the first person, male or female, to graduate with a science degree at the University of Adelaide.

Early life
Dornwell was born in New Zealand to German immigrant Bernhardt Carl Friedrich "Bernard" Dornwell and his wife Sarah. The family later moved to Adelaide, South Australia where Dornwell initially studied at the State Central Model School.

Following her father's early death when she was just 14, Dornwell won a bursary to attend the Advanced School for Girls (now Adelaide High School) the only state high school in South Australia during the 19th century.  Whilst at this school in 1880 she won first prize and £20 for the "Exhibition for Girls" examination.  She matriculated in 1882 with honours in French, German, animal physiology and modern history.

University education
Dornwell was accepted into a Bachelor of Science degree at The University of Adelaide in 1883, just two years after the university amended its charter to enrol women. She was one of the first women to enrol at the university and their first student, male or female, to enrol in a science program.

Dornwell excelled in her studies. In April 1883 she received the Sir Thomas Elder Prize in Physiology, for which she received a microscope.

In 1889 a representative of the University of Adelaide stated that "The most brilliant student in the science course, up to the present, has been a woman— Miss E Dornwell, who passed the first, second, and third year of that course first class in elementary physiology. As will be seen by reference to the winners of Sir T. Elder's prizes the women have been distinctly superior to the men."

Encouraged by her physiology teacher, Professor Edward Stirling, Dornwell stated "Dr Stirling said that if I were successful, and he was convinced that I would be, I would gain the distinction of being the first woman graduate of the university, and the first woman to graduate in science in Australia."

Dornwell graduated in 1885 with first class honours in physics and physiology.  At her graduation the university's chancellor, Chief Justice Sir Samuel Way said "In your distinguished undergraduate career, and in the manner in which you have taken that degree, you have not merely done honour to the University, but you have vindicated the right of your sex to compete, and to compete on equal terms, with other undergraduates for the honours and distinctions of the University."

Teaching career
Following her graduation Dornwell taught mathematics, physics, Latin and physiology at her former school, the Advanced School for Girls.  In 1887 she moved to Hawthorn, Victoria and became the resident teacher at the Methodist Ladies College and in 1890 she accepted the post as headmistress at the private Riviere Ladies' College in Woollahra, New South Wales. Whilst at Riviere Dornwell, she applied for the position of principal at the newly established Women's College at Sydney University, a post she did not win.

Marriage, family, and later life 
Dornwell married Lionel Charles Raymond at St Andrew's Church, Walkerville on 13 February 1895. Following their marriage Dornwell moved to Fiji where Raymond had accepted a post with the Commonwealth Sugar Refineries. The couple went on to raise two sons, Oliver and Roland, who were sent back to Sydney to continue their secondary education in Australia.

Upon her husband's retirement Dornwell returned to Sydney where she was active in the Lyceum Club and the National Council of Women.

Dornwell died in Sydney 18 November 1945, aged 80.

References

External links

 Teritiary Education for Women The Manning Index of South Australian History, State Library of South Australia
 Women graduates of the University of Adelaide SA Memory, State Library of South Australia
 Series 772 - Edith Emily Dornwell [Papers and Photographs] The University of Adelaide Archives
 140: Years - Making History Together, Lumen, The University of Adelaide
 Edith Emily Dornwell BSc (photograph) Flickr, The University of Adelaide
 The Encyclopedia of Women and Leadership in 20th Century Australia - Science

Australian schoolteachers
1865 births
1943 deaths
University of Adelaide alumni
New Zealand emigrants to Australia
Australian people of German descent
Australian headmistresses
19th-century Australian women
Australian expatriates in Fiji
People educated at the Advanced School for Girls